Ivan Desny (born Ivan Nikolaevich Desnitskij; 28 December 1922 – 13 April 2002) was a Chinese-born actor of Russian descent.

Early life
Desny was born in Peking, China.

Career
Desny was a film actor. Bilingual in French and German, he acted in more than 150 films, both in Germany and France. Desny appeared in the 1950 film Madeleine by the English director David Lean, who was then the husband of star Ann Todd.

Death

Desny died in Ascona, Switzerland.

Selected filmography 

 La fleur de l'âge (1947)
 Bonheur en location (1949) - Gordon junior
 Madeleine (1950) - Emile L'Anglier
 Les mousquetaires du roi (1951)
 La Putain respectueuse (1952) - Fred Clarke - le fils du sénateur
 The Lady Without Camelias (La signora senza camelie, 1953) - Bernardo 'Nardo' Rusconi
 Good Lord Without Confession (1953) - Maurice Fréjoul
 No Way Back (Weg ohne Umkehr, 1953) - Michael Zorin aka Mischa
 Act of Love (1953) - (uncredited)
 Confession Under Four Eyes (1954) - Gregor Marmara
 The Golden Plague (1954) - Sergeant Hartwig
 Master of Life and Death (1955) - Dr. Daniel Karentis
 Frou-Frou (1955) - Henry de Gaspard
 André and Ursula (1955) - André Duval
 Dunja (1955) - Minski
 A Girl Without Boundaries (1955) - Eric Johnson
 Lola Montès (1955) - Lieutenant Thomas James
 Ballerina (Rosen für Bettina, 1956) - Kostja Tomkoff, Choreograph
 Mannequins of Paris (1956) - Pierre Lanier
 The Story of Anastasia (1956) - Gleb Botkin
 Women's Club (1956) - Laurent Gauthier
 Anastasia (1956) - Prince Paul von Haraldberg
 The Night of the Storm (1957) - Viktor Ledin
 OSS 117 Is Not Dead (OSS 117 n'est pas mort, 1957) - Hubert Bonisseur de La Bath, alias OSS 117
 Von allen geliebt (1957) - Roger Marbeau
 Donnez-moi ma chance (1957) - Gilbert Arnaud
 Scandal in Bad Ischl (1957) - Graf Vanin
 All the Sins of the Earth (1958) - Lawyer Stephan Hardeck
  (1958) - Alexander Drubin
 One Life (1958) - De Fourcheville
 Life Together (1958) - Michel Sellier
 Le Miroir à deux faces (1958) - Gérard Durieu
 Polikuschka (1958) - Verwalter
 Frauensee (1958) - Frederic Fleury
 What a Woman Dreams of in Springtime (1959) - Pierre Bonvant
 Heiße Ware (1959) - Paul Martens
 Monsieur Suzuki (1960) - Stankovitch
 Satan Tempts with Love (1960) - Carlos
 Song Without End (1960) - Prince Nicholas
 Femmine di lusso (1960) - Count Luca di Sauvin
  (1961) - George Romanescu
 Daniella by Night (1961) - Count Castellani
 White Slave Ship (1961) - Captain Cooper
 Escapade in Florence (1962) - Count Roberto
 Bon Voyage! (1962) - Rudolph Hunschak
 Sherlock Holmes and the Deadly Necklace (1962) - Paul King
 Ist Geraldine ein Engel? (1963) - Jan
 Jack and Jenny (1963) - Wladimir
  (1963) - Prof. Lomm
 Frühstück mit dem Tod (1964) - Luke Adama
 Secret of the Sphinx (La sfinge sorride prima di morire - Stop Londra, 1964) - Green 
 Kidnapped to Mystery Island (I misteri della giungla nera, 1964) - Maciadi
  (1965) - Der Amerikaner
 Captain from Toledo (1965) - Don Felipe
 Who Wants to Sleep? (Das Liebeskarussell, 1965) - Baron Rudolf
 The Beckett Affair (1966) - Frederick
 Tender Scoundrel (Tendre Voyou, 1966) - Le vendeur de Cannes
 Der Tod eines Doppelgängers (1967) - Hoggan
 Da Berlino l'apocalisse (1967) - Steve
 I Killed Rasputin (1967) - Grand Duke Alexander
 Love Nights in the Taiga (1967) - Colonel Kirk
 Guns for San Sebastian (1968) - Col. Calleja
 Mayerling (1968) - Count Hoyos
 Rebus (1969) - Guinness
 The Adventures of Gerard (1970) - Gen. Lassalle
 Die Feuerzangenbowle (1970) - Marions Filmpartner
 Tatort:  (1971, TV) - Sievers
 The Body in the Thames (1971) - Louis Stout
 Little Mother (1973) - Colonel Umberia
 World on a Wire (Welt am Draht, TV mini-series) - Günther Lause
 Who? (1974) - General Sturmer
 Touch Me Not (1974) - Mailet
 El juego del diablo (1975) - Teacher
 The Wrong Move (Falsche Bewegung, 1975) - Industrieller / The Industrialist
 Paper Tiger (1975) - Foreign Minister
 Shir Khofteh (1976)
 The Conquest of the Citadel (Die Eroberung der Zitadelle, 1977) - Faconi
  (1977) - Baron Wurlitzer
 Red Rings of Fear (Enigma rosso, 1978) - Chief Inspector Louis Roccaglio
 The Marriage of Maria Braun (Die Ehe der Maria Braun, 1979) - Karl Oswald
 Bloodline (1979) - Jeweller
 Mathias Sandorf (1979, TV series) - Ladislaus Zathmary
 Berlin Alexanderplatz (1980, TV miniseries) -  Herr Pums
 Car-napping (1980) - Consul Barnet
 Fabian (1980) - Justizrat Labude
 I Hate Blondes (Odio le bionde, 1980) - Mr. Brown
  (1981) - Paul
 Exil (1981, TV miniseries) - Wiesener
 Lola (1981) - Wittich
 Ein gutes Land (1982)
 The Roaring Fifties (Die wilden Fünfziger, 1983) - Arzt
 The Future of Emily (Flügel und Fesseln, 1984) - Vater Charles
 Le Caviar rouge (1986) - Yuri
 Motten im Licht (1986)
 Hôtel de France (1987) - Maurice Veninger
 Un amore di donna (1988) - Avvocato Bernasconi
  (1988) - Schneider
 Good Evening, Mr. Wallenberg (God afton, Herr Wallenberg, 1990) - Schmidthuber
 La Désenchantée (1990) - L'oncle
 Zockerexpreß (1991)
 I Don't Kiss (J'embrasse pas, 1991) - Dimitri
 Thieves (Les Voleurs, 1996) - Victor
 Beresina, or the Last Days of Switzerland (Beresina oder Die letzten Tage der Schweiz, 1999) - Rudolf Stauffacher
 Mister Boogie (2000)

References

External links

1922 births
2002 deaths
Chinese male film actors
Chinese male television actors
20th-century Chinese male actors
Chinese people of Russian descent